Oshi Tōshō-gū (忍東照宮) is a Shinto shrine in Gyōda, Saitama Prefecture, Japan. It enshrines the first Shōgun of the Tokugawa Shogunate, Tokugawa Ieyasu.

See also 
Tōshō-gū
List of Tōshō-gū

External links 
Online listing

Shinto shrines in Saitama Prefecture